Asociația Sportivă Athletic 2007 Comănești, commonly known as Athletic Comănești, was a Romanian football club based in Comănești, Bacău County, founded in 2007 and dissolved in 2014.

History
In 2007,  in an attempt to revive football in Comănești, at the initiative of former footballers and several fans and with the support of local authorities and a group of friends from the Basque Country and concluding a partnership with Athletic Bilbao was founded Athletic 2007 Comănești.

Athletic played on its debut in Liga V – Bacău County, and after only one season, 2007–08, it managed to promote to Liga IV – Bacău County.
After the promotion, hit by the lack of interest from local authorities, the club are forced to move the team to the city of Dărmănești, and for the next two seasons, in which it finished on the following positions: 2008–09 – 6th and 2009–10 – 14th, the team name was AS Athletic 2007 Dărmănești.

In 2010, after Athletic Bilbao withdrew from the partnership and after the local authorities from Comănești returned to better feelings towards the club, Athletic returns to Comănești.

League history

References

External links
 Official website
 Athletic Comănești at frf-ajf.ro
 Bacău County Sport website 

Association football clubs established in 2007
Association football clubs disestablished in 2014
Defunct football clubs in Romania
Football clubs in Bacău County
2007 establishments in Romania
2014 disestablishments in Romania